Ọlájídé is both a surname and a given name of Yoruba origin meaning "a combination of prestige, success and wealth arose or resurrected". It may refer to:

People with the forename
Olajide Adebayo, Nigerian Anglican bishop
Olajide Aluko, Nigerian scholar
Olajide Bejide (born 1985), Nigerian cricketer
Olajide Olatunji (born 1993), better known as KSI, English YouTuber and rapper
Olajide Omotayo (born 1995), Nigerian professional table tennis player
Olajide Williams (born 1988), Nigerian football player
Olajide Williams (scientist) (born 1969), American neurologist

People with the surname
Tokunbo Olajide (born 1976), Canadian boxer